Ion Dragulschi (born April 15, 1950) is a Romanian sprint canoeist who competed in the 1970s. He won four medals at the ICF Canoe Sprint World Championships with three silvers (K-1 4 x 500 m: 1975, K-2 1000 m: 1973, K-4 500 m: 1977) and a bronze (K-2 500 m: 1973).

Dragulschi also competed in the K-1 1000 m event at the 1972 Summer Olympics in Munich, but was eliminated in the semifinals.

References

Sports-reference.com profile

1950 births
Canoeists at the 1972 Summer Olympics
Living people
Olympic canoeists of Romania
Romanian male canoeists
ICF Canoe Sprint World Championships medalists in kayak